B. K. Sadashiva (born 6 December 1946) is a former Indian cricket umpire. He stood in two ODI games between 1998 and 1999.

See also
 List of One Day International cricket umpires

References

1946 births
Living people
Indian One Day International cricket umpires
Cricketers from Mysore